How is an English surname, derived either from a contraction of Howe, or from various place names such as How, Cumbria. It may also be a variant spelling of the Chinese surname Hao. Notable people with the surname include:

Bradford How (born 1977), Canadian video jockey
Charles T. How (1840–1909), American real-estate developer
 Henry How (1828–1879), British-Canadian chemist, geologist and mineralogist
James Eads How (1874–1930), American hobo organizer
Jamie How (born 1981), New Zealand cricketer
Jane How (born 1951), English actress
Martin How (1931–2022), British composer and organist
Richard How (born 1944), Australian rugby union player
Walter How (1885–1972), English sailor
William Walsham How (1823–1897), English bishop of Wakefield

See also
 Howe (surname)
 Hao (surname)

English-language surnames